The France women's national football team represents France in international women's football. The team is directed by the French Football Federation (FFF). France competes as a member of UEFA in various international football tournaments such as the FIFA Women's World Cup, UEFA Women's Euro, the Summer Olympics, and the Algarve Cup.

The France women's national team initially struggled on the international stage failing to qualify for three of the first FIFA Women's World Cups and the six straight UEFA European Championships before reaching the quarter-finals in the 1997 edition of the competition. However, since the beginning of the new millennium, France have become one of the most consistent teams in Europe, having qualified for their first-ever FIFA Women's World Cup in 2003 and reaching the quarter-finals in two of the three European Championships held since 2000. In 2011, France recorded a fourth-place finish at the 2011 FIFA Women's World Cup; its best finish overall at the competition. In the following year, the team captured the 2012 Cyprus Cup and the fourth place at Women's Olympic Football Tournament.

Corinne Diacre has been the manager of the national team since 30 August 2017. The current captain of the national team is defender Wendie Renard.

History

Early history
In 1919, a women's football championship was established in France by the Fédération des Sociétés Féminines Sportives de France (FSFSF). On 29 April 1920, a team led by French women's football pioneer Alice Milliat traveled to England and played its first international match against English team Dick, Kerr's Ladies. The match, held in Preston, attracted more than 25,000 spectators. France won the match 2–0 and ended its tour with two wins, one draw, and one defeat. The following year, a return match in France at the Stade Pershing in Vincennes, a suburb of Paris, took place in front of over 12,000 spectators. The match ended in a 1–1 draw. In May 1921, France returned to England for friendlies. The team won its first match 5–1, then suffered three consecutive defeats. In October 1921, the English team returned to France contesting matches in Paris and Le Havre with both matches ending in stalemates. Despite women's football in England being prohibited by The Football Association in December 1921, France continued to go there on tour for matches. A victory for the French in Plymouth was followed by 0–0 draws in Exeter and Falmouth. By 1932, the female game had been called to an end and the women's league formed in 1919 by the FSFSF was discontinued. The last match by the FSFSF international team was another scoreless draw against Belgium on 3 April 1932.

Throughout the late 1960s in France, particularly in Reims, local players worked hard to promote awareness and the acceptance of women's football. A year before getting officially sanctioned, France took part in a makeshift European Cup against England, Denmark, and Italy. The tournament was won by the Italians. The Federal Council of the French Football Federation officially reinstated women's football in 1970 and France played its first official international match on 17 April 1971 against the Netherlands in Hazebrouck with Jocelyne Ratignier and Marie-Claire Caron-Harant scoring. That same year, France took part in the unofficial 1971 Women's World Cup, held in Mexico. The ladies continued the pirate games, which just made it into the margins of FIFA's records, until FIFA began overseeing the competition in 1991. Since 1982, UEFA has governed the European games.

Reinstatement
In 1975, the women's football league was officially reinstated, this time with backing from the French Football Federation, the governing body of football in France. Stade Reims was the best team in the country throughout the 1970s and early 1980s, thus constituted much of the French national squad. For the non-official World Cup in 1978 in Taiwan, the team included the entire Reims squad. The team shared the title with Finland, who never actually played the final. Due to receiving minimal support from the French Football Federation, who ultimately looked at women's football as not being highly regarded, France struggled in international competition failing to advance past the first round of qualification in both the 1984 and 1987 UEFA Women's Championship. Francis Coché, who managed the team during these failures, was later replaced by Aimé Mignot. Mignot helped the team finally get past the first round, however, in the quarterfinals, they lost to Italy, which meant they wouldn't appear at the 1989 UEFA Women's Championship. Despite the initial positives, Mignot failed to continue his success with France failing to qualify for both the 1991 and 1995 FIFA Women's World Cup and losing in the first round of qualification in three straight UEFA Women's Championships. After almost a decade in charge, Mignot was replaced by former women's international Élisabeth Loisel.

With Loisel in charge, the FFF, along with then France national football team manager Aimé Jacquet, moved the women's national team to Clairefontaine, which had quickly become a high-level training facility for male football players. As a result of the move, younger women were afforded the same benefits from the facilities offered by Clairefontaine as the men. The success of female training led to the formation of the Centre National de Formation et d'Entraînement de Clairefontaine, which is now referred to as the female section of the Clairefontaine academy. Under the tutelage of Loisel, the first results appeared encouraging. They reached their first-ever Women's World Cup qualifying for the 2003 edition after defeating England over two legs in a play-off game in London and again at the Stade Geoffroy-Guichard. The match in Saint-Étienne attracted more than 23,000 spectators and was broadcast by the popular French broadcasting company Canal Plus. Loisel's squad later qualified for the 2005 European Championship, where they were knocked out in the group stage. She was eventually sacked after failing to qualify for the 2007 FIFA Women's World Cup.

Team under Bruno Bini
Loisel was replaced by former football player and now coach Bruno Bini. Bini had been in charge of several France female international youth sides before accepting the role and was tasked with the job of qualifying for UEFA Women's Euro 2009. Due to the success of the Clairefontaine project and the surprising emergence of the French women's first division, Division 1 Féminine, Bini inherited a team full of emerging, young, and influential talent, which included the likes of Camille Abily, Sonia Bompastor, Louisa Necib, Élise Bussaglia, Laura Georges, and Corine Franco. Bini was also provided with leadership from captain Sandrine Soubeyrand. Early results under Bini were extremely positive with France finishing first in their Euro qualifying group only conceded two goals. France also performed well in friendly tournaments, such as the Nordic Cup and Cyprus Cup. At UEFA Women's Euro 2009, France were inserted into the group of death, which consisted of themselves, world powerhouse Germany, no. 7 ranked Norway, and an underrated Iceland. France finished the group with 4 points, alongside Norway, with Germany leading the group. As a result of the competition's rules, all three nations qualified for the quarterfinals. In the knockout rounds, France suffered defeat to the Netherlands losing 5–4 on penalties after no goals were scored in regular time and extra time.

Current Manager
Corinne Diacre is the current manager of France's women's national team and was appointed in August 2017. She has led the French national team to success as champions in the SheBelieves Cup in 2017 and runner-ups in 2018.

2011 Women's World Cup

Bini's next task was to qualify for the 2011 FIFA Women's World Cup after the disappointment of four years earlier. In the team's qualifying group, France finished the campaign scoring 50 goals and conceded none over the course of ten matches (all wins). On 16 September 2010, France qualified for the World Cup following the team's 3–2 aggregate victory over Italy.

At the 2011 FIFA Women's World Cup in Germany, France qualified to the knockout stage by finishing in second place in its group after wins over Nigeria and Canada, and a loss to the host team. The team went on to beat England on penalty kicks in the quarterfinals, but lost to the United States in the semi-finals. France finished the competition in fourth place and earned qualification to the Olympic football tournament at the 2012 Summer Olympics in London; it was the nation's first appearance in the competition. Striker Marie-Laure Delie was the only multiple goal scorer for France in the tournament, while defenders Sonia Bompastor and Laura Georges as well as midfielder Louisa Necib were selected to the All-Star Team.

Golden era
France has entered one of the most successful eras in the country's women's football history. In the UEFA Women's Euro 2013 held in Sweden, France stood top of the group, beating Spain, England and Russia to earn its ticket to the quarter-finals. However, Bergeroo's side lost to Denmark in a penalty shootout, thus failing to advance to the semi-finals.

2015 FIFA Women's World Cup
In the 2015 FIFA Women's World Cup held in Canada, France was listed to Pot 1, and was a favorite to become champions. France was named to Group F, alongside England, Mexico and Colombia. In the opening match against England, a goal from Eugénie Le Sommer gave France a 1–0 victory. However, France was shocked by Colombia in a 2–0 loss, making Colombia only the second Latin American team to win a Women's World Cup match. Therefore, France's third and final group stage match against Mexico was a must-win. France went on to beat Mexico 5–0 to qualify to the knockout round as top of the group.

In the knockout round, France eased past South Korea in a 3–0 win in Montreal to remain at the same location awaiting the quarter-final match against Germany. In the quarter-final match against Germany, despite dominating the majority of the match, France were unable to capitalize on their chances, which ultimately cost them the game. France were finally able to score in the 64th minute through Louisa Nécib, but failed to keep the lead as Célia Šašić scored on an 83rd-minute penalty kick. The score was 1–1 after 120 minutes, resulting in the match to be decided in a penalty shootout, where France's 5th penalty taken by Claire Lavogez was denied by Nadine Angerer, in which France were eliminated from the tournament losing 4–5 on penalty kicks.

UEFA Women's Euro 2017
France won all matches at the UEFA Women's Euro 2017 qualifying Group 3. The home matches had sizable crowds, with 7,761 spectators attending the Romania match at the MMArena in Le Mans, 15,028 spectators at the Ukraine match at the Stade du Hainaut in Valenciennes, 24,835 spectators at the Greece match at Roazhon Park in Rennes, and 7,521 spectators at the Albania at Stade Jean-Bouin in Paris. The team scored a win and two draws at the UEFA Women's Euro 2017 Group C, and was defeated by England in quarter-finals.

2019 FIFA Women's World Cup
In March 2015, France was selected to host the 2019 FIFA Women's World Cup of the tournament. Having automatically qualified as hosts, France was considered a favorite to win the tournament, along with the United States. The team opened with three victories against Norway, Nigeria, and South Korea, winning its group with a total of 9 points. In the round of 16, France defeated Brazil by a score of 2–1, but lost to the United States in the quarterfinal with the same score of 2–1. This Women's World Cup was particularly notable, as it was used as a platform by many women's teams to campaign for equal pay between men and women.

Team image

Nicknames
The France women's national football team has been known or nicknamed as the "Les Bleues (The Blues)".

Media coverage

FIFA Women's World Cup

UEFA Women's Euro

Friendly and Qualifiers

Overall competitive record

Overall record

Results and fixtures

 The following is a list of matches in the last 12 months, as well as any future matches that have been scheduled.

2022

2023

Coaching staff

Current coaching staff

As of 9 March 2023.

Managerial history

  Pierre Geoffroy (1971-1978)
  Francis-Pierre Coché (1978-1987)
  Aimé Mignot (1987–1997)
  Élisabeth Loisel (1997–2007)
  Bruno Bini (2007–2013)
  Philippe Bergeroo (2013–2016)
  Olivier Echouafni (2016–2017)
  Corinne Diacre (2017–2023)

Players

Current squad
The following 26 players were named in the squad for the 2023 Tournoi de France.

Caps and goals are correct as of 21 February 2023, after the match against Norway.

Recent call-ups
The following players have also been called up to the squad in last 12 months.

INJ Injured
COV Withdrew from squad due to COVID-19

Previous squads

FIFA Women's World Cup squads
2003 FIFA Women's World Cup – France
2011 FIFA Women's World Cup – France
2015 FIFA Women's World Cup – France
2019 FIFA Women's World Cup – France

UEFA European Championships squads
UEFA Women's Euro 2009 – France
UEFA Women's Euro 2013 – France
UEFA Women's Euro 2017 – France

Summer Olympics squads
2012 Summer Olympics – France
2016 Summer Olympics – France

Records

, after the match against France.
Players in bold are still active, at least at club level.

Most caps

Most goals

Honours

Invitational trophies
 Cyprus Cup: Winner 2012, 2014
 SheBelieves Cup: Winner 2017
 Tournoi de France: Winner 2020, 2022, 2023

Competitive record

FIFA Women's World Cup

*Draws include knockout matches decided by penalty kicks.

Match history

Olympic Games

UEFA Women's Championship

*Draws include knockout matches decided by penalty shootout.

See also
Sport in France
Football in France
Women's football in France
France women's national under-19 football team
France women's national under-17 football team
FIFA Women's World Cup
UEFA Women's Championship

References

External links
Official website
FIFA profile

 
European women's national association football teams